Statistics of Japan Soccer League for the 1976 season.

League tables

First Division

Promotion/relegation Series 

Since Eidai dropped out of the league and folded in March 1977, Fujitsu was promoted, meaning no team was relegated.

Second Division

JSL promotion/relegation Series 
Nissan Motors, future Yokohama Marinos, currently Yokohama F. Marinos, joined the league for the first time.

Nissan promoted. Furukawa Chiba was not relegated due to Eidai's withdrawal.

References
Japan - List of final tables (RSSSF)

1976
1
Jap
Jap